Hysni Krasniqi (born 10 March 1942 in Lukare/Llukar, near Pristina]) is an Albanian painter and graphic artist. After studying art in Pristina he went to Belgrade where he graduated from the Academy of Figurative Arts of Belgrade in 1969.

Thereafter he taught Academy of Figurative Arts of Pristina. His works are primarily inspired by rural landscapes and farms.

Notes

Sources 

Albanian painters
1942 births
Living people
Artists from Pristina